Consign to Oblivion is the second studio album by Dutch symphonic metal band Epica, and was released in 2005. The song "Trois Vierges" features a guest appearance by then-Kamelot vocalist Roy Khan. The album's lyrics are inspired by the Maya civilization. The phrase "In lak' ech, hala ken” expresses the concept of unity of Mayan thought, after which the song "Another Me (In Lack' Ech)" was named. The CD was released with copy control on it. This CD started a new collection of songs, called "A New Age Dawns". This saga is continued on the album Design Your Universe.

Stylistically, the album is more focused towards orchestration than other Epica releases and features heavy use of a chorus.  Additionally, Mark Jansen's death growls appear less frequently, occurring on only three songs, "Force of the Shore", "Mother of Light" and "Consign to Oblivion". But a bonus track, the Death cover "Crystal Mountain" includes grunts, and a grunt version of "Quietus" was released on the "Quietus (Silent Reverie)" single, making it five songs with grunts. A single with an acoustic version of the song "Solitary Ground" was extracted from the album The Score – An Epic Journey, released the same year.

The bonus cover of "Crystal Mountain" is one of the very few Epica songs to not feature Simone Simons in any capacity (although an "Orchestral version" featuring her vocals can be found on The Road to Paradiso, and the Quietus (Silent Reverie) single).

The album is the band's only release to date where Simone Simons' lyrical contributions outnumber those of Jansen.

Track listing

Personnel
Credits for Consign to Oblivion adapted from liner notes.

Epica
Simone Simons – lead vocals
Mark Jansen – rhythm guitar, grunts, screams
Ad Sluijter – lead guitar
Yves Huts – bass
Coen Janssen – synths
Jeroen Simons – drums

Additional musician
Roy Khan – vocals on "Trois Vierges"

Orchestra
Benjamin Spillner – violin
Andreas Pfaff – violin
Tobias Rempe – violin
Gregor Dierk – violin
Swantje Tessman – viola
Patrick Sepec – viola
Astrid Müller – viola
Jörn Kellermann – cello

Choir
Melvin Edmonsen – bass
Previn Moore – tenor
Andre Matos – tenor
Annie Goebel – alto
Amanda Somerville – alto, vocal coach
Bridget Fogle – soprano
Linda van Summeren – soprano

Production
Sascha Paeth – production, engineering, mixing, acoustic guitar on "Dance of Fate"
Olaf Reitmeier – production, engineering
Miro – orchestral arrangements, engineering
Mark Jansen – orchestral arrangements
Coen Janssen – orchestral and choir arrangements
Yves Huts – orchestral arrangements
Philip Colodetti – engineering, mixing
Hans van Vuuren – executive production, coordination, research
Peter van 't Riet – mastering

Notes

References

Epica (band) albums
2005 albums
Transmission (record label) albums